Balsane or Balsana is a village in Sakri Taluka, Dist Dhule, Maharashtra, India. It is known for two shrines, Kanubai Mata Temple and Vimalnath Swami Jain Temple. Nearby village, there are well maintained ancient caves. Thus Balsane becomes an interesting tourist and religious destination.

Goddess Kanbai Temple
Goddess kanbai is said to be "avatar" of goddess parvati. She is well worshiped goddess in Maharashtra as well as the places where maharashtrians lived. She is said to be wife of "Kanher", "avatar" of God Shiva. This temple was made by Holkar queen. Now-a-days it is preserved by Maharashtra Government. The area around this ancient temple contains two more temples. One of God Shiva and one Of God Surya (Sun). The Surya temple is broken and also the idol of God Surya is broken, The Shiva Temple is in well condition and worshiped by the villagers.

Kanbai temple is having three parts inside. Entrance is short and then comes middle hall which is having a number of small temples on right and left in recesses. Due to unavailability of natural light this portion is in darkness. the third part is the smaller room having idol of goddess Kanbai clad by "sindur" saffron colour powder used by Hindus on holy occasions. The entrance of the main third room is decorated with old Hindu carvings and was coloured by some stranger.

Goddess Kanbai is worshiped by Maharashtrian Ahirani people as she is deity of many communities in this region. In Shravan month according to Hindu calendar the first Sunday after Nag-panchami, festival of Kanbai is celebrated. On following day (Monday) people go to nearby riverside and Visarjan is done. The kanbai festival is celebrate in first or second week of shravan month of Marathi panchang.

Vimalnath swami Jain temple
Vimalnath swami was the thirteenth Jain tirthankar. His idol was found by a farmer buried in land. It was letter given to acharya Shrimad Vijay Vidyanand Surishwarji by him and then a temple was made in Balsane. After that two dharamshala were also built by Jains.

References

Villages in Dhule district